Kazım Bingen (born 5 May 1912, date of death unknown) was a Turkish cyclist. He competed in the individual and team road race events at the 1936 Summer Olympics.

References

External links
 

1912 births
Year of death missing
Turkish male cyclists
Olympic cyclists of Turkey
Cyclists at the 1936 Summer Olympics
Place of birth missing